Highland Hose No. 4 is located in Kearny, Hudson County, New Jersey, United States. The firehouse was added to the National Register of Historic Places on May 29, 1987. The firehouse was constructed in 1894 to be used by Highland Hose No. 4. The firehouse is currently used as a meeting hall for the Firemen's Mutual Benevolent Association. Locals refer to the building as "The Exempts".

See also
National Register of Historic Places listings in Hudson County, New Jersey

References

External links
 View of Highland Hose No. 4 via Google Street View

Buildings and structures in Hudson County, New Jersey
Fire stations completed in 1894
Fire stations on the National Register of Historic Places in New Jersey
Defunct fire stations in New Jersey
Kearny, New Jersey
National Register of Historic Places in Hudson County, New Jersey
New Jersey Register of Historic Places